The 1978 Tulsa Golden Hurricane football team represented the University of Tulsa as a member of the Missouri Valley Conference during the 1978 NCAA Division I-A football season. In their second year under head coach John Cooper, the Golden Hurricane compiled an overall record of 9–2 record with a mark of 4–1 in conference play, placing second in the MVC. The team defeated Virginia Tech (35–33), Kansas State (24–14), Louisville (24–7), Cincinnati (27–26), and Wichita State (27–13), but lost to No. 2-ranked Arkansas (21–13) and MVC champion New Mexico State (23–20).

The team's statistical leaders included quarterback David Rader with 1,683 passing yards, Sherman Johnson with 826 rushing yards, and Rickey Watts with 730 receiving yards. Head coach John Cooper was later inducted into the College Football Hall of Fame.

Schedule

Notes

References

Tulsa
Tulsa Golden Hurricane football seasons
Tulsa Golden Hurricane football